Malek Faliz (also Romanized as Malek Fālīz; also known as Malek Vālīz and Malik Waliz) is a village in Nesa Rural District, Asara District, Karaj County, Alborz Province, Iran. At the 2006 census, its population was 139, in 39 families.

References 

Populated places in Karaj County